Perth Gas Company was a gas producer in Perth, Western Australia.  It had plant in East Perth that was constructed in 1886, and superseded by new operators and plant in 1922.

The company conducted a range of improvements and modifications to its works.

In the 1890s there were various governmental actions regarding the company.

The company was in liquidation in 1913.

It was the predecessor to the East Perth Gas Works which established its operations a decade later.

Records of the company have survived in archival institutions.

References

East Perth, Western Australia
1886 establishments in Australia
Defunct oil and gas companies of Australia
Energy in Western Australia
Companies based in Perth, Western Australia
1913 disestablishments in Australia
Australian companies established in 1886
Energy companies established in 1886
Energy companies disestablished in 1913